= Mijnenlegger I =

History

Netherlands
- Name: Mijnenlegger I
- Operator: Royal Netherlands Navy
- Builder: Marine Etablissement te Soerabaja
- Laid down: 1942
- Fate: Destroyed on 2 March 1942

General characteristics
- Type: Minelayer
- Displacement: 1,900 t (1,900 long tons)
- Propulsion: 4,800 hp (3,600 kW)
- Speed: 19 knots (35 km/h; 22 mph)
- Armament: 2 x 10.2 cm cannons; 40 mm machine guns

Mijnenlegger I was a planned minelayer for the Royal Netherlands Navy. However, before the ship could be completed the Japanese invaded the Dutch East Indies and as a result the ship was destroyed to prevent it from being captured. If the ship had been completed it would have been the largest and fastest minelayer of the RNN at the time.

== Design and construction ==
Mijnenlegger I was ordered in 1941 at the Marine Etablissement te Soerabaja in the Dutch East Indies. The next year, in 1942, the ship was laid down.

=== Armament ===
As the ship was still in the early phase of being constructed it was not yet fully decided what kind of armament the minelayer would be equipped with.

== Bibliography ==
- Bosscher, Ph.M. (1986). De Koninklijke Marine in de Tweede Wereldoorlog (in Dutch). Vol. 2: Indië tot en met 8 maart 1942. Wever. ISBN 90-6135-372-6.
- Mark, Chris (1997). Schepen van de Koninklijke Marine in W.O. II (in Dutch). De Alk. ISBN 90-6013-522-9.
- Raven, G.J.A., ed. (1988). De kroon op het anker: 175 jaar Koninklijke Marine (in Dutch). De Bataafsche Leeuw. ISBN 90-6707-200-1.
- Roetering, B., ed. (1997). Mijnendienst 1907-1997 90 jaar: feiten, verhalen en anekdotes uit het negentigjarig bestaan van de Mijnendienst van de Koninklijke Marine (in Dutch). ISBN 90-90-10528-X.
- von Münching, L.L. (1978). Schepen van de Koninklijke Marine in de Tweede Wereldoorlog (in Dutch). Alk. ISBN 90-6013-903-8.
